Alann Torres (born September 24, 2003) is an American professional soccer player who plays as a midfielder for Indy Eleven.

Career

Youth 
From 8U-14U, Torres played club soccer for Magic SC (now Indiana Fire Academy North), based out of Middlebury, IN.  He then played briefly for Elkhart County United before moving to Indiana Fire Juniors.  He played two years of high school soccer at Bethany Christian High School.  

In 2021, Torres was part of Indy Eleven's USL Academy League team that won the USL Academy League Playoffs in Tampa, Florida, earning First Team All-Tournament honors after scoring two goals and two assists.

Professional 
Torres was signed to a USL Academy contract by USL Championship side Indy Eleven on August 9, 2021. Torres made his professional debut on September 22, 2021, coming on as a substitution in the 82nd minute of a 1–0 loss to Memphis 901 FC.

Torres was signed to his first professional contract by Indy Eleven in the following offseason on January 21, 2022. Before the start of the 2022 season, Torres was sent on a season-long loan to Forward Madison FC of USL League One.

References 

2003 births
Living people
People from Elkhart, Indiana
American soccer players
Indy Eleven players
Forward Madison FC players
Association football midfielders
Soccer players from Indiana
USL Championship players
USL League One players